Lou Majaw (born 1947) is a performing artist from Shillong in the North-Eastern India and is renowned for his Bob Dylan tribute shows.

Born to a poor family, the Majaws could not afford a guitar or a radio. In a friend's house he was introduced to the music of Bill Haley and Elvis Presley, and taught himself the guitar as most boys and girls did in those days. His mother sent him to a boarding school where his love for music grew. Majaw then moved on to Kolkata (Calcutta) where he sang in bars and pubs for various groups such as the Dynamite Boys, Vanguards, Supersound Factory, and Blood and Thunder, The Meghalaya Love Project. In 1966, Lou was introduced to Bob Dylan's work. Inspired by his music, he later organized a "Dylan's birthday concert" in Shillong on 24 May 1972. Since then he has organized the concert each year on 24 May to pay obeisance to Dylan, with the shows generating national and international interest.

On 24 May 2011, Lou Majaw(pronounced Lu Majao) celebrated the 70th birthday of Bob Dylan with a grand concert with one band each from 8 states of North East India. The bands were- Hip Pocket (Kolkata), Alive (Sikkim), D'luzion (Assam), Swraijak (Tripura), Evenflow (Mizoram), Cleave(Manipur), Incipit(Nagaland), Symmetry Clan(Arunachal Pradesh) and Midnight Garden Factor(Meghalaya).

On 24 October 2016, Lou Majaw was awarded with the 4th Dr Bhupen Hazarika Award by the Governor of Assam for his contribution to music.

References

External links

1947 births
Living people
Indian rock musicians
People from Shillong
Khasi people
Indian male singer-songwriters
Indian singer-songwriters
Indian guitarists
Musicians from Meghalaya